Michigan State University alumni number around 634,300 worldwide. Famous Spartans include NBA star Earvin "Magic" Johnson; MLB stars Kirk Gibson, Steve Garvey, Robin Roberts; NFL stars Brad Van Pelt, Bubba Smith, Herb Adderley and Joe DeLamielleure; actors James Caan and Robert Urich; Evil Dead trilogy director Sam Raimi; LGBT rights activist and internet personality Tyler Oakley; former Michigan governors James Blanchard, Fred M. Warner, and John Engler; U.S. Senator Debbie Stabenow; former U.S. Senator Spencer Abraham; billionaires Eli Broad, Reinhold Schmieding, Drayton McLane, Jr., Harley Hotchkiss, Thomas H. Bailey, Tom Gores, Andrew Beal and Dan Gilbert.

Michigan State's faculty and academic staff number around 4,500 researchers. Throughout the years, notable researchers have included William J. Beal, who developed hybrid corn; psychologist Erich Fromm; G. Malcolm Trout, who invented the process for the homogenization of milk; and Barnett Rosenberg, the discoverer of cancer-fighting drug cisplatin.

In addition to faculty, Michigan State has around 6,000 administration and non-academic staff. This includes the university's governing board, the board of trustees. Elected by statewide referendum every two years, trustees have eight-year terms, with two of the eight elected every other year. As of 2007, the board is made up of three Republicans and five Democrats, and has a 4:4 gender balance.

Other notable staff members include President Samuel L. Stanley, athletic director Bill Beekman, men's basketball coach Tom Izzo, ice hockey coach Danton Cole, and football coach Mel Tucker.


Notable alumni

Academia

Administration

Biology

Business

Education

Engineering

Law

Medicine

Physics

Psychology

Other sciences

Social science

Arts and media

Cinema

Journalism

Literature

Music

Television and radio

Theatre

Visual arts

Business

Consumer goods

Finance

Industry

Politics and government

Activism

Diplomacy

Armed Forces

Law

Public office

Sports and athletics

Baseball

Basketball

Bodybuilding

Football

Golf

Gymnastics

Ice hockey

Running

Soccer

Jordan Gruber (born 1983), American-Israeli soccer player

Olympians

Mixed martial arts

Wrestling

Faculty and administration

Notable faculty

Arts and humanities

Science

Social science

Current administration

Board of Trustees
{| class="wikitable"
|+Current Trustees
!Name
!End of term
!Position
!Reference
|-
|Dianne Byrum
|2025
|Chair
|
|-
|Dan Kelly
|2025
|Vice Chair
|
|-
|Joel Ferguson
|2021
|
|
|-
|Melanie Foster
|2023
|
|
|-
|Brian Mosallam
|2021
|
|
|-
|Renee Knake Jefferson
|2023
|
|
|-
|Brianna T. Scott
|2027
|
|
|-
|Kelly Tebay
|2027
|
|
|}

Head coaches

Former administration

Presidents

References

External links
 MSU Alumni Office

Michigan State University people